Buckner Hill House is a historic plantation house located near Faison, Duplin County, North Carolina. It was built about 1860, and is a two-story, five bay by five bay, square Italianate style frame dwelling with a cruciform plan. The house rests on high brick piers and is capped by a low deck-on-hip roof. It features lavish wooden and plaster ornamentation and center bay porches on each elevation. Also on the property are the contributing kitchen, smokehouse, and storehouse.

It was listed on the National Register of Historic Places in 1975.

The house is open for tours by appointment.

References

Plantation houses in North Carolina
Houses on the National Register of Historic Places in North Carolina
Italianate architecture in North Carolina
Houses completed in 1860
Buckner
National Register of Historic Places in Duplin County, North Carolina
Buckner
Buckner